The 2020/21 FIS Ski Jumping Continental Cup is the 30th in a row (28th official) Continental Cup winter season in ski jumping for men and the 17th for ladies. This is also the 19th summer continental cup season for men.

Other competitive circuits this season include the World Cup, Grand Prix, FIS Cup and Alpen Cup.

Map of continental cup hosts 
All 20 locations hosting continental cup events in summer (5 for men / 3 for ladies) and in winter (14 for men / 3 for ladies) this season.

 Men
 Ladies
 Men & Ladies

Men

Summer

Winter

Ladies

Summer

Winter

Men's standings

Summer

Winter

Ladies' standings

Summer

Winter

Europa Cup vs. Continental Cup 
Last two seasons of Europa Cup in 1991/92 and 1992/93 are recognized as first two Continental Cup seasons by International Ski Federation, although Continental Cup under this name officially started first season in 1993/94 season.

References 

FIS Ski Jumping Continental Cup
2020 in ski jumping
2021 in ski jumping